Bhadradeepam is a 1973 Indian Malayalam film, directed by M. Krishnan Nair and produced by Sharada and T. Sathyadevi. The film stars Prem Nazir, Sharada and Sujatha in the lead roles. The film has a musical score by M. S. Baburaj. The film was a commercial success.

Plot
Rajasekharan, a wealthy businessman, is married to Usha, and is leading a happy family life. One day Usha dies and Rajasekharan suspects she was poisoned by her close friend Rajani. In order to take revenge, he marries Rajani and forces upon her a bleak life devoid of all pleasure. Eventually Rajasekharan discovers that Rajani had nothing to do with his Usha's death, but it is too late by then.

Cast
Prem Nazir as Rajasekjaran
Sharada as Rajani (dubbed by KPAC Lalitha)
Sujatha as Usha
Jose Prakash as Venu, the Doctor
Adoor Bhasi as Devarajan Potty and Unni Swamy
T. R. Omana as Lakshmikutty Amma
T. S. Muthaiah as Usha's father
K. P. Ummer as Prakash, the Manager
Philomina as Rajani's mother
Vincent as Mohan, Usha's brother
Shoba as Lekha, Rajani's sister
M. L. Saraswathi as Amminikutty, Lakshmikutty Amma's daughter
Khadeeja as Brothel lady (guest appearance)

Soundtrack
The music was composed by M. S. Baburaj and the lyrics were written by Vayalar Ramavarma and K. Jayakumar.

References

External links
 

1973 films
1970s Malayalam-language films
Films directed by M. Krishnan Nair